The Continental Cup, also known as the Kontinental Cup, is the trophy presented to the winner of the regular season of the Kontinental Hockey League, i.e. the team with the most points at the end of the regular season.

The name and trophy were introduced during the second season of the competition. In the first season it was simply named the regular season winner. During the history of KHL, the winner of Continental Cup had never won Gagarin Cup in the same season before 2018–19, when CSKA Moscow became the first team to win both trophies.

Cup winners 

Bold Team with the most points ever accumulated in a season during the trophy's existence.

See also
Gagarin Cup, awarded to the winner of the KHL play-offs
Presidents' Trophy, an NHL trophy having the same function as the Continental Cup

References

External links
, an article on the official website of Traktor Chelyabinsk with a picture of Mikhail Yurevich receiving the trophy from Alexander Medvedev

Kontinental Hockey League trophies and awards